At the 1900 Summer Olympics, a polo tournament was contested.  Matches were held on 28 May, 31 May, and 2 June. Five teams competed. Most of the teams were of mixed nationality, with British and French athletes competing on three teams. There was no playoff for third place.

Background

The "Olympic" polo tournament, or the "Grand Prix International d'Exposition", was one of multiple polo tournaments played in Paris in late May and early June 1900. It was the first time that polo was played at the Olympics; the sport would appear again in 1908, 1920, 1924, and 1936. Each time, the tournament was for men only.

Competition format

The competition was a single elimination tournament, with no third place match. Teams did not have to consist of entirely players from a single nation at the time, with most of the teams competing being mixed. Further, players were apparently permitted to play for multiple teams during the same tournament, as Maurice Raoul-Duval played for both Bagatelle and Compiègne.

Participating nations
A total of 20 players from 4 nations competed at the Paris Games:

Results

Rosters

Foxhunters Hurlingham

BLO Polo Club Rugby

Bagatelle Polo Club de Paris

Mexico National Polo Team

Compiègne Polo Club

Medal table

All four medals were won by mixed teams. Great Britain had competitors on the gold, the silver and one of the bronze medal teams, the United States on the gold, the silver medal teams and one of the bronze medal teams. France had players on the silver and one of the bronze medal teams, while Mexico had three players on the other bronze medal team.

Notes

References
 International Olympic Committee medal winners database
 De Wael, Herman. Herman's Full Olympians: "Polo 1900". Accessed 25 February 2006.
 

 
1900 in polo
1900 Summer Olympics events
1900